Elsa Malpartida ( 1961 – 21 January 2022) was a Peruvian politician who was a member of the Andean Parliament, elected on the Union for Peru ticket. Malpartida died on 21 January 2022, at the age of 60.

References

1960s births
2022 deaths
Year of birth missing
Place of birth missing
21st-century Peruvian politicians
21st-century Peruvian women politicians
Union for Peru politicians